Lagrave is a commune in the Tarn department in southern France.

Lagrave may also refer to:
 LaGrave Field, an abandoned baseball park in Fort Worth, Texas
 Édouard Timbal-Lagrave (1819-1888), French pharmacist and botanist
 Frédéric Labadie-Lagrave (1844-1917), French physician
 Maxime Vachier-Lagrave (born 1990), French chess grandmaster

See also
 Ambarès-et-Lagrave, a commune in the Gironde department in the Nouvelle-Aquitaine region of southwestern France
 La Grave, a commune in the Hautes-Alpes department in southeastern France